Vakeel Saab is a 2021 Indian Telugu-language action legal drama film written and directed by Venu Sriram. The film was produced by Dil Raju, Sirish and Boney Kapoor under their banners Sri Venkateswara Creations and Bayview Projects. It is a remake of the 2016 Hindi-language film Pink and stars Pawan Kalyan, Nivetha Thomas, Anjali, Ananya Nagalla, Prakash Raj, and Shruti Haasan.

Principal photography of the film began in January 2020 in Hyderabad. The film features score and soundtrack by S. Thaman. Initially postponed due to the COVID-19 pandemic, the film was theatrically released on 9 April 2021.

Plot
Pallavi, Zareena, and Divya are independent working women and they all live together in Hyderabad. One night their car breaks down in the middle of the highway and Viswa, who is Pallavi's friend offers them a lift. Moments later Bunty and Viswa rush Vamsi to the nearest hospital because Vamsi is bleeding from a heavy injury to his head. At the same time, the three women return to their apartment in a taxi. They look disoriented, and it is implied that they have something to do with the incident. They then try to move on from what happened that night.

At the same time a drunk and jobless Satyadev moves to a new colony and comes across these three girls. Threats arise from Vamsi as he pushes for revenge for the injury Pallavi caused Vamsi. The threats result in Zareena losing her job. They are ultimately discouraged from filing a complaint, stating it would make their daily lives more miserable. In reality, the local police are aware that the men are "well-connected" and backed by MP Korentla Rajendra who is Vamsi's father.

The next day, Pallavi is kidnapped by Vamsi's friends. Pallavi is threatened, blackmailed, and molested in the moving car and dropped back home, leaving her shaken. A few days later, she is arrested based on a complaint from Vamsi labeling the women as prostitutes and charging Vamsi with attempted murder. At this point, Zareena and Divya are hopeless and then they stumble across Satyadev. Satyadev suggests that they can get an emergency bail from a lawyer. The girls do not believe him as he seems like an alcoholic. They later discover that Satyadev was a reputable and respectable lawyer but he gets suspended for 4 years due to him harming a fellow lawyer in court. At the same time, his wife dies due to pregnancy complications & fits when Satyadev had to leave her alone at home causing him to ultimately give up the profession. He then declines to help Zareena and Divya with the case but later on he gets attacked by the Rajendra's men and decides to represent Pallavi in court.

Scared of Satyadev, Vamsi and Rajendra meet Advocate Nanda Gopal who agrees to take up the case. In the courtroom, Nanda presents the following version of events in the court: Vamsi and his friends help Pallavi and her friends due to their cab breaking down. They invite the women for dinner at a resort, since they said that they were hungry, where they have drinks. The women provoke the men, become intimate, and thereafter demand money, all signs indicating that they are prostitutes. Vamsi refuses to pay and an enraged Pallavi hits him on the head with a bottle and flees. Nanda's argument focuses on the poor moral character of the women. He attacks the fact that Pallavi has family in Hyderabad but chooses to live with her friends.

Pallavi and her friends' state that the men tried to sexually assault them. Vamsi tried to rape Pallavi, and she attacked him with the bottle in self-defense. Satyadev's argument focuses on the issue of consent and a woman's right to say no. A series of chilling courtroom arguments ensues in the following days. Towards the end of the trial, Zareena is provoked by Nanda to say that she took the money from the men causing a distress in the court. However, Satyadev does not give up and he makes Vamsi enrage leading him to reveal the truth, stating that the women “Got what they deserved”.

Satyadev criticizes the regressed views of the society where women are stereotyped as prostitutes if they come home late, move out, want to be independent, drink and so on, but none of these apply to men. He closes with the fact that his client said “NO”. No means no, and does not require further explanation. The next day, Satyadev and the women are attacked by Siva on the train but Satyadev fights them off and they go back to the court. The women are then acquitted while Vamsi, Bunty, and Siva are charged, with their sentences pending while Viswa is let off with a warning. After the case is closed, Satyadev decides to come back to his profession to help the common people with their problems. Zareena regains a job, Pallavi gets engaged and Divya enters her newly constructed home.

Cast 

 Pawan Kalyan as Advocate Konidela Satyadev 
 Nivetha Thomas as Vemula Pallavi
 Anjali as Zareena Begum
 Ananya Nagalla as Divya Nayak
 Prakash Raj as Advocate Nandagopal
 Shruti Haasan as Amritha Konidela, Satyadev's wife (special appearance)
 Vamsi Krishna as Korentla Vamsi, Rajender's son
 Mukesh Rishi as MP Korentla Rajender, Vamsi's father
 Srikanth Iyyengar as CI K. Yugander
 Lirisha as SI Saraladevi
 Kedar Shankar as Vemula Kedarnath, Pallavi's father
 Kamal Kamaraju as Anwar, Zareena's fiancé
 Ananda Chakrapani as Aravind Nayak, Divya's father
 Anish Kuruvilla as Subhojit Rana, Zareena's CEO Manager Only
 Subhalekha Sudhakar as Flat Owner
 Sarath Babu as Discipline Committee Chairman
 Chaitanya Krishna as Suchaant, Satyadev's college friend
 Shivakumar Ramachandravarapu as Viswa
 Kalyan as Bunty
 Amit Sharma as Siva
 Nagineedu as ACP B. Ravinder
 Sayaji Shinde as Minister Shankar Reddy
 Kancharapalem Raju
 Dev Gill as Shankar Reddy's Right Hand
 C. V. L. Narasimha Rao
 Appaji Ambarisha Darbha as Amritha's father
 Sammeta Gandhi as Ranganna
 Ramesh Reddy as Chari
 Swarnakanth as Assistant Lawyer to Nanda Gopal

Production

Development 
In November 2019, Venu Sriram started working on the remake of Pink (2016) after his project with Allu Arjun titled Icon was put on hold. Pawan Kalyan accepted the script narrated by Sriram, marking Kalyan's return to cinema after a sabbatical owing to his political campaign in the 2019 Andhra Pradesh Legislative Assembly election. Dil Raju of Sri Venkateswara Creations is jointly producing the film with Boney Kapoor, who acquired the Tamil and Telugu remake rights of Pink (the former was released as Nerkonda Paarvai), under his Bayview Projects LLP. S. Thaman was selected as the music director of the film, marking his maiden collaboration with Pawan Kalyan. The film has cinematography by P. S. Vinod with editing by Prawin Pudi.

During the pre-production works, the tentative titles Maguva, Lawyer Saab, and Vakeel Saab, were under consideration for the film before the latter was finalised  official title in March 2020. In a September 2020 interview, director Venu Sriram announced that the film cannot be made as a commercial entertainer due to the social issues involved in the Hindi counterpart, but staying true to the original script, the team had made some changes suiting Pawan Kalyan's body language.

Casting 
While Pawan Kalyan was reported to essay Amitabh Bachchan's role while Anjali, Nivetha Thomas, and Ananya Nagalla are cast in pivotal roles. The team decided to approach Shruti Haasan and Ileana D'Cruz to appear for a cameo role, essaying the character of Kalyan's wife in the film. While Haasan initially refuted being a part of the film's cast, she later confirmed her presence in July 2020, despite not revealing her role in the film.

Filming 
Principal photography of the film was commenced on 20 January 2020 in Hyderabad. In the end of February 2020, shooting of the film took place at Annapurna Studios with intense scenes being shot on Pawan Kalyan and Prakash Raj. The film's production was halted for six months due to COVID-19 pandemic in March 2020 and on 22 September 2020, the shooting of the film resumed in Hyderabad, following the relaxation of COVID-19 lockdown in India with the team following the safety guidelines imposed by the government to control COVID-19 spread. Major scenes without featuring Kalyan were shot during this schedule.

On 6 October, Nivetha Thomas joined the sets of the film. Later on 1 November, Kalyan joined the shooting sets of the film with the team planning to shoot the entire schedule within 15 days. Some scenes of the film were also shot in Hyderabad Metro. Kalyan completed his portions of filming on 29 December 2020, whereas the team shot few sequences; the shooting of the film completed on 9 January 2021. Pawan Kalyan started dubbing for his portions for the film in March 2021 and completed within five days.

Music

The film's soundtrack features five tracks composed by S. Thaman with lyrics written by Ramajogayya Sastry and Suddala Ashok Teja. The album was released on 31 March 2021 through Aditya Music label.

Production 
On 12 February 2020, Thaman had announced that he is currently working on the production of the first song, with Sid Sriram collaborating with Thaman for the second time after "Samajavaragamana" from Ala Vaikunthapurramuloo with Ramajogayya Sastry writing the lyrics. Later on 26 February, Thaman stated the progress of the song with Fames Macedonian Symphonic Orchestra performing the sessions for it. That song was titled "Maguva Maguva" which is touted to be a "fitting tribute to women", and was released on 8 March 2020 (Women's Day). In September 2020, the lyrical video of the song crossed 30 million views on YouTube.

The production of the other songs and the background score was interrupted due to the COVID-19 pandemic lockdown. Nearly a year after the release of the first single, "Sathyameva Jayate", the second single from the film was unveiled on 3 March 2021. The song is picturised on Pawan Kalyan, whom being portrayed as a do-gooding lawyer who fights on behalf of the innocent, unprivileged and weaker sections of society. The third song "Kanti Papa" released on 17 March 2021, is played during the flashback portion featuring the romance track between Kalyan and Shruti Haasan. The team also planned to release a promotional song featuring Pawan Kalyan at the film's pre-release event, but it did not happen.  The fourth song "Kadhulu Kadhulu" was unveiled along with the film's soundtrack album on 31 March 2021. A bonus track, which is the female version of "Maguva Maguva" was released on 15 April.

On 18 October 2021, Thaman announced that he was going to be releasing the film's score, due to popular demand, on all streaming platforms in November. The film's score was then released on 16 November 2021 on Aditya Music.

Marketing 
As a part of the film's marketing purposes, #VakeelSaab Music Fest, a promotional music concert was organised by the producers. The first edition of this event took place at MLRITM College in Hyderabad on 20 March 2021. Following its response, the second edition of this event was held at Vizag and Kakinada on 23 March 2021. The events were attended by Thaman, Sastry and Sriram as the primary members. Thaman and his musical crew performed all the songs in the promotional music concert, as well as the film's pre-release event held at Shilpakala Vedika in Hyderabad on 4 April 2021.

Track listing

Release 
Vakeel Saab was scheduled to be released on 15 May 2020, but was postponed due to the COVID-19 pandemic. Dil Raju refuted the rumours of a direct release through over-the-top media service (OTT) and also stated that the film will be a theatrical release. In January 2021, a new release date of 9 April 2021 was announced.

The benefit shows for the opening day release was cancelled due to surge in COVID-19 cases. However, Dil Raju announced that the film will get benefit shows in select theatres across Telangana and Andhra Pradesh. The advance bookings for the film opened up on 6 April 2021, and saw a tremendous response from trade analysts.

Phars Film bought the distribution rights for United States which planned to screen in more than 700 theatres on 8 April, a day before the Indian release. Trade analyst Taran Adarsh announced through Twitter, stating that Panorama Studios acquired the distribution rights for the film in North Indian theatres. Vakeel Saab will also be screened at IMAX Melbourne, the world's largest cinema theatre.

Marketing 
The pre-release event of this film was scheduled to take place on 3 April 2021 at Yousufguda Police Grounds in Hyderabad. However, as the authorities denied permission for the promotional activities of the film citing surge in COVID-19 cases, the team decided to shift the venue at Shilpakala Vedika in Hyderabad on 4 April.

Pre-release revenue 

Home media 
The film's digital rights were sold to Amazon Prime Video and Aha and the satellite rights were sold to Zee Telugu respectively. The film however was streamed 21 days later through Amazon Prime Video on 30 April 2021 due to the COVID-19 pandemic in India.

Dubbed versions 
The film was dubbed and released in Malayalam with the same name and in Kannada as Advocate. It was also dubbed in Tamil as Vakeel Sir despite the existence of a Tamil remake.

Controversy 
In the early April 2021, Andhra Pradesh High Court made a judgment that the price of tickets of the film can be hiked for first three days. Several people argued that Government of Andhra Pradesh deliberately is not allowing for premiere shows and hike of tickets price, although High Court gave a decision. Several leaders of Bharatiya Janata Party and Telugu Desam Party criticised the government for the decision.

Reception

Critical reception 
The Times of India critic Neeshita Nyayapati called Vakeel Saab a "courtroom drama with a generous dose of masala." She felt that Venu Sriram has stuck to the plot of Pink for the most part but tweaked the screenplay to suit Kalyan's image. She appreciated the score composed by Thaman. Hemanth Kumar in his Firstpost review rated the film 3/5 and wrote that the film is a celebration of Kalyan's stardom and an evocative commentary on how women are judged in the society. He observed that the film was at its best when it was close to source material. "Vakeel Saab wants to fight the right fight, even when it turns its gaze away from the three women at the centre of all the drama to glorify its lead actor," Kumar added.

Sangeetha Devi Dundoo of The Hindu stated that the film hit the right notes in the courtroom proceedings. On performances she noted that Nivetha, Anjali, and Ananya were "remarkable," Kalyan was at his best for the courtroom proceedings and Prakash Raj aced the role that requires him to be truly sinister. The Indian Express journalist Manoj Kumar R opined that director Sriram and Kalyan honoured the main subject and the message of the original film. A reviewer from Deccan Chronicle rated the film 3/5 and stated that the remake stays "true to the original" and the star cast delivered on their performances. Haricharan Pudipeddi in his Hindustan Times review compared the film with the other versions of the story (Pink and Nerkonda Paarvai) and opined that Vakeel Saab is "more massy and lightweight."

In a review for Telangana Today, L. Ravinchander wrote that Vakeel Saab is a mixed bag and added, "This court room drama has punch but a great opportunity to make a masterpiece goes abegging." Film Companion's Karthik Keramulu felt that the flash back episode took central focus away from the story of Pink but the court scenes featuring Kalyan and Prakash Raj were hotter than the original. Keramulu wondered whether the film would open up debates around the idea of consent or be understood as an action film where the hero saves the women.

Jahnvi Reddy of The News Minute called Vakeel Saab a "superficial remake" of Pink. She wrote that there might have been better ways of changing the script to venerate the star while staying true to the spirit of the story but alteration of several striking scenes from the original diluted the point they made. Cinema Express critic Ram Venkat Srikar stated that Vakeel Saab does a criminal disservice to the original. He criticised the dilution of narrative about consent and the addition of political undertones to the film.

Box office 
On the opening day, the film grossed more than 42 crore at the box office, with a distributor's share of 33 crore. Box Office India reported that Vakeel Saab is the highest opener in India post the pandemic, netting over 38 crore on its first day. The film collected a gross of 100 crore in its first week.

At the US box office, the film grossed $300,000 on the opening day. Taran Adarsh through his Twitter account, reported that the film collected a gross of A$211,857 and NZ$19,220 at the Australian and New Zealand box offices in the first two days respectively.

Vakeel Saab netted 120 crore in India, surpassing the Hindi and Tamil versions of the film. By the end of its theatrical run, the film grossed 137.65 crore worldwide, earning the distributors a share of 86.1 crore.

References

External links 
 
 

Telugu remakes of Hindi films
Indian courtroom films
Films shot in Hyderabad, India
Films postponed due to the COVID-19 pandemic
2020s Telugu-language films
2021 drama films
Films set in Rajahmundry
Indian drama films
Sri Venkateswara Creations films